Bandham  is an Indian Telugu language soap opera directed by Polani Nagendra kumar premiered on 16 July 2018 and ended on 21 August 2021 aired on Gemini TV every Monday to Saturday. The serial stars Bharadwaj, Sindhura, Anika Rao in season 1 and Niharika, Aishwarya Raj, Abhishek Yannam, Devaraj Reddy in season 2 as main protagonists.

Cast

Season 2
Niharika as Vaishnavi
Aishwarya Raj as Bhoomi
Gowri Shankar / Abhishek Yannam as Akhil
Devaraj Reddy as Rakesh
Swaroopa as Parvathi (Vaishnavi's Grand mother)
Lydia

Season 1
Bharadwaj as Balu
Sindhura Dharmasanam as Devaki
Anika Rao as Yashoda
Sandhya peddada as Parvathi (Balu's mother, Vaishnavi and Bhoomi's grand mother)
J L Srinivas as Ranganath (Balu's father , Vaishnavi and Bhoomi's grand father)
Venu kshatriya as Hari
Prasad Babu as Nagendra Prasad (Devaki's father)
Sujatha Reddy / Madhavi as Bharathi (Devaki's mother)
Baby Vasuki / Baby Sahasra as Bhoomi (Balu and Devaki's daughter)
Baby Siri / Baby Greeshma as Vaishu (Balu and Yashoda's daughter)
Nakshatra as Sanjana
Sujatha as Jagadeeswari
Naveen as Parthasaradhi
Anchor Bhargav as Avinash
Lavanya Reddy as Bhavani (Devaki's sister)
Madhavi latha as Lakshmi (Yashoda's mother)
Kranthi as Nagamani
Ram Mohan as Satyam
Sindhuja as Deepa
Naveena
Sravani 
Nata kumari

References

External links
 Official website 

Indian television soap operas
Telugu-language television shows
2018 Indian television series debuts
Gemini TV original programming